Haute école may refer to:

The haute école (F. "high school"), advanced components of Classical dressage
The "airs above the ground", dressage movements practiced at classical riding schools such as the Spanish Riding School, Vienna, Austria
A vocational university